Lawrence Daws (born 1927) is an Australian painter and printmaker, who works in the media of oil, watercolour, drawing, screenprints, etchings and monotypes.

In the 1980s he started making computer prints, and was possibly the first established Australian painter to use this medium.

His subjects are often landscapes, including deserts, of Tasmanian forests and the tropical rainforests of Queensland.

Daws grew up on the Fleurieu Peninsula in South Australia, and from 1970 until 2010, lived by the Glasshouse Mountains at Beerwah on the edge of a Queensland rainforest, where many of his best-known works were created.

In the 1960s he lived and exhibited in London in solo shows and with other Australians, including Brett Whiteley.

From 1977 he was a Trustee of the Queensland Art Gallery and was responsible for acquiring some major paintings for the gallery, including a major painting by Victor Pasmore.

A biography of Daws was published in 1982, written by Neville Weston.

Griffith University, Brisbane, and University of the Sunshine Coast, Queensland have awarded honorary doctorates to Daws.

In 2016 Lawrence Daws was interviewed in a digital story and oral history for the State Library of Queensland's James C Sourris AM Collection. In the interview Daws talks to Bettina MacAulay, a Brisbane Art Valuer about his life, his paintings and computer generated prints, and how his interest in philosophy, literature and psychology has influenced his work.

Exhibitions 
Adelaide Festival, Feb-March 2008 – Major retrospective Drawings, Prints, 1947–2007

Collections 
Art Gallery of NSW 
National Gallery of Victoria 
The Tate, London 
Ipswich Art Gallery 
Exhibition and artist ephemera held by the State Library of Queensland.

References

External links
 Daws's home page
 Lawrence Daws artist interview: The James C. Sourris AM Collection, John Oxley Library, State Library of Queensland, 26 February 2016. 6min, 33min and 1:22min version available to view online.
 Portrait of an artist: Lawrence Daws. Portrait of an Artist is an in conversation event series by the State Library of Queensland.
 Artworks Feature: Lawrence Daws (Transcript of one-hour interview), Artworks, ABC Radio National, Sunday 18 May 2008. "One of the grand masters of the Australian art scene" – Julie Copeland.
 Grafico Topico review of Lawrence Daws 1999 exhibition
 Lawrence Daws digital story, State Library of Queensland. Part of the Johnstone Gallery digital stories and oral histories collection

Australian painters
Australian printmakers
1927 births
Living people
Artists from South Australia